Line technician may refer to:

 Line technician (automotive) or heavy line technician,  a reference to driveline technician
 Line technician (aviation), commonly known as a line tech, line guy, gas jockey or ramp rat